The Rough Guide to the Music of Central America is a world music compilation album originally released in 2001. Part of the World Music Network Rough Guides series, it has been described as the first comprehensive CD collection of Central American music. The album contains five tracks from Belize, three each from Honduras, Nicaragua, and Costa Rica, two from Panama, and one from Guatemala. The compilation was compiled by Daniel Rosenberg, co-ordinated by Duncan Baker and produced by Phil Stanton, co-founder of the World Music Network.

Thom Jurek of AllMusic gave the album four stars, calling the music a "revelation" and a "stunning wake-up call". Robert Christgau was less enthusiastic, describing the album as leaning more toward Creole cultures than the "subcontinent" warranted.

Track listing

References 

2001 compilation albums
World Music Network Rough Guide albums